Hendrik Johansen (19 April 1889 – 9 June 1948) was a Danish gymnast. He competed in the men's team event at the 1908 Summer Olympics.

References

1889 births
1948 deaths
Danish male artistic gymnasts
Olympic gymnasts of Denmark
Gymnasts at the 1908 Summer Olympics
Sportspeople from Copenhagen